Henri Louis Bischoffsheim (17 February 1829 – 11 March 1908) was a Dutch banker.

He took over Bischoffsheim, Goldschmidt & Cie in London from his father Louis-Raphaël Bischoffsheim.

He founded Deutsche Bank, Paribas Bank, and Société Générale. He died in 1908 in London, leaving an estate of £1,622,332 (equivalent to £ million in ).

See also
Bischoffsheim family

References

1829 births
1908 deaths
Dutch bankers
Dutch Jews
British bankers
British Jews
Dutch emigrants to England
Dutch people of German-Jewish descent
Businesspeople from Amsterdam
British people of German-Jewish descent
Jewish bankers
19th-century British businesspeople
Dutch people of Belgian descent
British people of Belgian-Jewish descent
British people of Dutch-Jewish descent